The Seattle Children's Theatre (SCT) is a resident theatre for young audiences in Seattle, Washington, founded in 1975. Its main performances are at the Seattle Center in a 482-seat and a 275-seat theatre, from September through June. SCT also has a drama school with its own performances during the summer. Total annual attendance is about 220,000.

SCT is a member of Theatre Puget Sound, International Performing Arts for Youth, and Theatre Communications Group.

Education programs
SCT has several theatre education programs held at schools and other organizations in the Seattle area. The on-site Drama School has classes year-round, taught by professional artists, and produces summer shows providing young people with participatory theatre education and theatre arts training. SCT's Deaf Youth Drama Program, founded by brothers Howie and Billy Seago, ran from 1994 to 2007. Seattle Children's Theatre has gained national and international prominence as a producer of theatre, educational programs, and new scripts for young people.

Production history

1975-2000 
1975
 Little Red Riding Hood *
 Winnie-the-Pooh
 You're a Good Man, Charlie Brown
 The Tinder Box
 Gertrude Stein's First Reader
1976
 Hansel and Gretel
 Imperial Nightingale *
 Foolery *
 Tom Sawyer
 Ice Wolf
1977
 The Prince and the Pauper *
 Aladdin's Lamp *
 Pippi Longstocking
 Alice in Wonderland *
 Circus Home *
1978
 The Wind in the Willows
 Pinocchio *
 Step on a Crack *
 The Legend of Sleepy Hollow
 A Tale of King Arthur *
1979 - Fifth Season
 The Hobbit
 The Revenge of the Space Pandas or Binky Rudich & the Two Speed Clock
 Doc Maynard *
 Cinderella
 Ozma of Oz *
1980
 Treasure Island
 The Boy Who Talked to Whales *
 Five Minutes to Morning
 Huck Finn *
 To Kill a Mockingbird
1981
 The Ransom of Red Eye
 Heidi
 The Miracle Worker
1981-82
 The Diary of Anne Frank
 Maggie's Gift Outside *
 Heidi (Part II) *
 Twilight of a Crane
1982-83
 Dracula *
 The Best Christmas Pageant Ever
 Families *
 The Comedy of Errors
 Mother Hicks *
1983-84
 Great Expectations *
 Pinocchio *
 The Best Christmas Pageant Ever
 The Tempest
 Newcomer
 Tall Tales from Mark Twain
1984-85 - Tenth Season
 The Count of Monte Cristo
 The Snow Queen
 The Best Christmas Pageant Ever
 Birds *
 Through Separate Doors
 The Miser
1985-86
 The Former One-on-One Basketball Champion
 Puss in Boots *
 The Best Christmas Pageant Ever
 Robin Hood *
 The Strange Case of Dr. Jekyll and Mr. Hyde *
 Little Lulu *
1986-87
 The Curse of Castle Mongrew *
 Snow White and the Seven Dwarfs *
 Follow the Drinking Gourd: A Play About Harriet Tubman *
 Tales of a Fourth Grade Nothing *
 The Three Musketeers *
 Little Lulu
1987-88
 The Hunchback of Notre Dame *
 Rocky and Bullwinkle *
 Most Valuable Player
 James and the Giant Peach
 The Death and Life of Sherlock Holmes *
1988-89
 Up the Down Staircase
 The Hoboken Chicken Emergency *
 The Secret Garden
 According to Coyote
 The Would-Be Gentleman
1989-90 - Fifteenth Season
 Rip Van Winkle and the Legend of Sleepy Hollow: A Tribute to Washington Irving *
 The Magic Mrs. Piggle-Wiggle *
 Apollo: To the Moon
 Amelia Earhart: Flights of Fancy
 Jungalbook
 Tuck Everlasting *
1990-91
 Captain Fantasto *
 The Reluctant Dragon
 The Magic Mrs. Piggle-Wiggle
 The Council *
 Anne of Green Gables *
 There's a Boy in the Girls' Bathroom *
1991-92
 The Firebird *
 Nancy and Plum *
 Charlotte's Web
 Roll of Thunder, Hear My Cry *
 Make Me Pele for a Day *
1992-93
 Invisible Friends
 Doctor Dolittle in the Moon *
 The Invisible Man *
 The Velveteen Rabbit
 Dragonwings
 Ramona Quimby
1993-94
 Afternoon of the Elves *
 Jack and the Beanstalk *
 The Hardy Boys in the Mystery of the Haunted House *
 The Rememberer *
 Just So and Other Stories *
1994-95 - Twentieth Season
 Sara Crewe *
 A Wrinkle in Time *
 The Yellow Boat
 Winnie-the-Pooh *
 the Portrait the Wind the Chair *
 Little Rock *
1995-96
 Naomi's Road **
 The Day After Tomorrow **
 The Magic Mrs. Piggle-Wiggle
 The Witch of Blackbird Pond *
 Romeo and Juliet
 Alice's Adventures in Wonderland *
1996-97
 The Taste of Sunrise: Tuc's Story *
 Bunnicula *
 Pinocchio *
 The Short Tree and the Bird Who Could Not Sing **
 The Odyssey
 The Hardy Boys in the Secret of Skullbone Island *
1997-98
 Still Life With Iris *
 Stellaluna *
 A Day at the Beach *
 Mr. Popper's Penguins
 Pink and Say *
 Frog and Toad *
 The Tempest
1998-99
 Kenny's Window *
 Cyrano **
 The Cricket in Times Square *
 Lilly's Purple Plastic Purse *
 The Book of Ruth *
 The King of Ireland's Son *
1999-00 - Twenty-Fifth Season
 The Boxcar Children *
 The Velveteen Rabbit
 Time Again in Oz *
 Apple to Grandma **
 The Midwife's Apprentice *
 When I Grow Up I'm Gonna Get Some Big Words *

2000-2016 
2000-01
 Animal Farm
 The Red Balloon
 Prince Brat and the Whipping Boy *
 Mask of the Unicorn Warrior *
 Winnie-the-Pooh
 Sideways Stories from Wayside School *
2001-02
 Johnny Tremain *
 The Hoboken Chicken Emergency
 The Wrestling Season
 Charlotte's Web
 Into the West
 Holes *
2002-03
 Our Only May Amelia *
 The Big Friendly Giant
 The Lion, the Witch and the Wardrobe
 The Outsiders
 Go, Dog. Go! *
 Nicky Somewhere Else **
 The Shakespeare Stealer
2003-04
 The True Confessions of Charlotte Doyle *
 The Gingerbread Man
 The Lion, the Witch and the Wardrobe
 Tibet Through the Red Box *
 The Shape of a Girl **
 Mrs. Piggle-Wiggle *
2004-05 - Thirtieth Season
 The Magic City *
 Bunnicula
 The Secret Garden
 The Red Badge of Courage *
 Glittra's Mission **
 A Year With Frog and Toad
 Alexander and the Terrible, Horrible, No Good, Very Bad Day
2005-06
 Seussical
 Nothing is the Same
 Sleeping Beauty
 Peter and the Wolf *
 The Devil and Daniel Webster *
 Honus and Me *
 Junie B. Jones and a Little Monkey Business
2006-07
 Harriet's Halloween Candy
 Jason and the Golden Fleece
 The Sorcerer's Apprentice *
 Goodnight Moon *
 Afternoon of the Elves
 Everyone Knows What a Dragon Looks Like *
 Addy: An American Girl Story *
2007 - Special Event
 The Green Sheep
2007-08
 Disney's High School Musical
 The Big Friendly Giant
 The Neverending Story *
 Hamlet
 The Hundred Dresses
 According to Coyote
 Busytown *
2008 - Special Events
 The Green Sheep
 Night of the Living Dead
2008-09
 Bluenose**
 The Wizard of Oz
 Tomás and the Library Lady
 Pharaoh Serket and the Lost Stone of Fire*
 A Tale of Two Cities
 Goodnight Moon
 I Was a Rat!*
2009-10 - Thirty-Fifth Season
 Mysterious Gifts: Theatre of Iran **
 If You Give a Mouse a Cookie
 Peter Pan
 Perô
 In the Northern Lands: Norse Myths *
 Getting Near to Baby
 Brementown Musicians *
2010-11
 The Green Sheep: based on the book by Mem Fox and Judy Horace; directed by Cate Fowler
 The Borrowers: By Charles Way, based on the books by Mary Norton; directed by Rita Giomi
 Morgan's Journey
 Lyle the Crocodile: Book by Kevin Kling, music and lyrics by Richard Gray, based on the book by Bernard Waber; directed by Linda Hartzell
 Go, Dog, Go!: By Steven Dietz and Allison Gregory, based on the book by P.D. Eastman; directed by Steven Dietz
 The Man Who Planted Trees: by Richard Medrington, Rick Conte and Ailie Cohen, based on the book by Jean Giono; directed by Ailie Cohen
 Jackie and Me*: By Steven Dietz, based on the book by Dan Gutman; directed by Sheila Daniels
2011-12
 Harold and the Purple Crayon*: Book by Don Darryl Rivera, music by Auston James, lyrics by Rob Burgess, based on the books by Crockett Johnson
 Robin Hood: By Greg Banks
 A Year with Frog and Toad: Music by Robert Reale, book and lyrics by Willie Reale, based on the books by Arnold Lobel
 A Single Shard*: Based upon the book by Linda Sue Park, adapted by Robert Schenkkan; directed by Linda Hartzell
 HELP: Presented by Theatergroep Max., music by John Lennon, Paul McCartney, Vincent Van Warmerdam and others; directed by Moniek Merkx
 The Very Hungry Caterpillar and Other Eric Carle Favorites: Adapted, directed, and designed by Jim Morrow, music by Steven Naylor; directed by Jim Morrow
2012-13
 Dr. Seuss’ The Cat in the Hat: Based on the book by Dr. Seuss; directed by R. Hamilton Wright
 Danny, King of the Basement: By David S. Craig; directed by Rita Giomi
 The Wizard of Oz: By L. Frank Baum, adapted by John Kane, music and lyrics by Harold Arlen and E.Y. Harburg; directed by Linda Hartzell
 Dot & Ziggy: Created by Linda Hartzell, Mark Perry, and Seattle Children's Theatre, music by Chris Walker; directed by Linda Hartzell
 The Edge of Peace*: By Suzan Zeder; directed by Linda Hartzell
 Adventures with Spot*: Adapted for the stage by Rob Burgess, Linda Hartzell, and Don Darryl Rivera, based on the books by Eric Hill; directed by Linda Hartzell
 Crash*: By Y York, based on the novel by Jerry Spinelli; directed by Rita Giomi
2013-14
 Pippi Longstocking: The Family Musical: Music and lyrics by Sebastian, adapted for the stage by Sebastian and Staffan Götestam, based on the novel by Astrid Lindgren; directed by Rita Giomi
 Dot & Ziggy: Created by Linda Hartzell, Mark Perry, and Seattle Children's Theatre, music by Chris Walker; directed by Linda Hartzell
 James and the Giant Peach*: Words and Music by Justin Paul and Benj Pasek, book by Timothy Allen McDonald, based on the book by Roald Dahl; directed by Linda Hartzell
 Pinocchio: By Carlo Collodi, adapted by Greg Banks, produced and commissioned by Children's Theatre Company; directed by Greg Banks
 The Boy at the Edge of Everything*: By Finegan Kruckemeyer, a co-production with Trusty Sidekick Theater Company; directed by Jonathan Shmidt Chapman
 Art Dog*: Based upon the book by Thacher Hurd, adapted by John Olive, composed by Susan Ennis; directed by Rita Giomi
2014-15 - Fortieth Season
 The Garden of Rikki Tikki Tavi: By Y York, adapted from the story by Rudyard Kipling; directed by Rita Giomi
 Dick Whittington and His Cat*: By Jeff Church, based on an English folk tale, original music by Richard Gray; directed by Allison Narver
 Mwindo*: By Cheryl L. West; directed by Linda Hartzell
 Goodnight Moon: Book, music, and lyrics by Chad Henry, adapted from the book by Margaret Wise Brown and Clement Hurd; directed by Rita Giomi
 Robin Hood: By Greg Banks; directed by Allison Narver
2015-16
 Elephant and Piggie's "We Are in a Play!": Script and lyrics by Mo Willems, music by Deborah Wicks La Puma; directed by Rita Giomi
 Chitty Chitty Bang Bang: Music and Lyrics by Richard M. Sherman and Robert B. Sherman, music by special arrangement with Sony/ATV publishing, adapted for the stage by Jeremy Sams, based on the MGM Motion Picture, licensed script adapted by Ray Roderick; directed by Linda Hartzell
 Where the Wild Things Are: Based on the book by Maurice Sendak, a Presentation House Production, originally adapted for the stage by TAG Theatre Glasgow, Scotland; directed by Kim Selody
 Hana's Suitcase: Based on the book by Karen Levine, published by Second Story Press, produced by Young People's Theatre, Toronto, Ontario, Canada; directed by Allen MacInnis
 Brooklyn Bridge: A co-production with The University of Washington School of Drama, written by Melissa James Gibson; directed by Rita Giomi
 Dr. Seuss The Cat in the Hat: Based on the book by Dr. Seuss; directed by Linda Hartzell  
2016-17
 The Lion, The Witch, and the Wardrobe: By C.S. Lewis; Dramatized by Adrian Mitchell, music composed by Shaun Davey; Directed by Linda Hartzell
 Stellaluna: Adapted by Saskia Janse, Based on the book by Janell Cannon, Music by Guus Ponsioen; Directed by Onny Huisink
 The Snowy Day and Other Stories by Ezra Jack Keats: By Jerome Hairston, based on the book by Ezra Jack Keats; directed by Peter C. Brosius
 Into the West: Adapted by Greg Banks, from the film Into the West; Written by Jim Sheridan, Music Composed by Thomas Johnson
 Seedfolks: Adapted from the book by Paul Fleischman; Produced by Children’s Theatre Company, Minneapolis, MN;
Directed by Peter C. Brosius
 Fire Station 7*: Co-conceived by Linda Hartzell and Vincent Delaney, written by Vincent Delaney; directed by Linda Hartzell
2017-18
 Go, Dog. Go!: adapted by Allison Gregory and Steven Dietz, based on the book by P.D. Eastman
 Mr. Popper’s Penguins: adapted for the stage by Pins and Needles Productions, music by Luke Bateman and lyrics by Richy Hughes
 The Little Prince: adapted by Rick Cummins and John Scoullar, based on the book by Antoine de Saint-Exupéry, music by David Dabbon
 Citizen 13559: The Journal of Ben Uchida: adapted by Naomi Iizuka, based on the book by Barry Denenberg
 Naked Mole Rat Gets Dressed: The Rock Experience*: book and lyrics by Mo Willems, music by Deborah Wicks La Puma (Later adapted into an HBO Max animated feature.)
 The Lamp is the Moon: by Kirk Lynn
2018-19
  The Very Hungry Caterpillar Show: Based on the book written by Eric Carle; Created and directed by Jonathan Rockefeller
  And in this Corner: Cassius Clay: By Idris Goodwin; Directed by Malika Oyetimein
  The Velveteen Rabbit: A Unicorn Theatre (UK) Production, by Margery Williams; Directed by Purni Morell
  The Miraculous Journey of Edward Tulane: Adapted by Dwayne Hartford, from the book by Kate DiCamillo; Directed by Courtney Sale
  Balloonacy: By Barry Kornhauser; Directed by Rita Giomi
  The Diary of Anne Frank: By Frances Goodrich and Albert Hackett; Adapted by Wendy Kesselman; Directed by Janet Allen
2019-20
  Black Beauty: By James Still, adapted from the book by Anna Sewell; directed by Courtney Sale
 Corduroy: By Barry Kornhauser, Based on the book by Don Freeman; directed by Kathryn Van Meter
 Snow White: By Greg Banks; directed by Desdemona Chang
 The Best Summer Ever!: By Kevin Kling; directed by Steven Dietz
 Don't Let the Pigeon Drive the Bus: The Musical!: Based on the Pigeon books by Mo Willems, script by Mo Willems and Tom Warburton, lyrics by Mo Willems, music by Deborah Wicks La Puma (postponed to April/May 2022)

 * = World Premiere  ** = American Premiere

Affiliated artists

Choreographers 
 Jason Ohlberg, Choreographer 
 Marianne Roberts, Choreographer

Directors 
 Rex E. Allen, Director
 Alyssa Keene, Dialect Coach 
  David Duvall, Musical Director 
 Francesca Zambello, Director 
 Geoffrey Alm, Fight Director 
 Greg Banks, Adaptor/Director 
 Jeff Church, Director 
 Kathleen Collins, Director 
 Mark Lutwak, Director 
 R. Hamilton Wright, Director 
 Rita Giomi, Director 
 Valerie Curtis-Newton, Director 
 Onny Huisink, Director/Set, Puppet, and Costume Designer 
 Michael Koerner, Composer/Musical Director

Designers 
 Shelley Henze Schermer, Set Designer
 Carey Wong, Set Designer 
 Catherine Hunt, Costume Designer 
 Chris R. Walker, Composer/Sound Designer 
  Douglas N. Paasch, Puppet Designer/Coach 
 Edie Whitsett, Set Designer 
 Etta Lilienthal, Set Designer 
 Jeanette deJong, Costume Designer 
 Jennifer Lupton, Set Designer 
 Matthew Smucker, Scenic Designer 
 Melanie Taylor Burgess, Costume Designer 
 Michael Wellborn, Lighting Designer
  Rick Paulsen, Lighting Designer 
 Sarah Nash Gates, Costume Designer 
 Tristan M. T. Dalley, Puppet Designer

Writers 
 Allison Gregory, Playwright/Choreographer 
 Barbara Field, Playwright 
 Chad Henry, Playwright/Composer 
 Charles Way, Playwright 
 Cheryl L. West, Playwright 
 David Henry Hwang, Playwright 
 Deborah Lynn Frockt, Playwright 
 Gary L. Blackwood, Author/Playwright 
 Hummie Mann, Composer
 John Olive, Playwright 
 Joe Sutton, Playwright 
 Jon Klein, Playwright 
 Kevin Kling, Playwright 
 Laurie Brooks, Playwright 
 Louis Sachar, Author 
  Saskia Janse, Playwright/Dramaturg 
 OyamO, Playwright 
 Paula Wing, Playwright 
 Robert Schenkkan, Playwright 
 Sid Fleischman, Author/Playwright 
 Steven Dietz, Playwright/Director 
 Y York, Playwright

IT worker conviction

In 2009, information technology worker William Edgar Hoke, was arrested and subsequently convicted of possessing at least 13,000 pornographic images of children, spanning over three years of browsing illegal bulletin boards which he accessed from both home and work computers. There was no indication that Hoke had unsupervised contact with children at SCT. He was charged by the U.S. Immigration and Customs Enforcement as part of Operation Predator, a program aimed at bringing to justice those who prey upon children. He was sentenced to eighteen months in prison as well as ten years probation.

See also
Plays for Young Audiences

References

External links
 Seattle Children's Theatre website
 Plays for Young Audiences website
 Seattle Children's Theatre at HistoryLink

Children's theatre
Drama schools in the United States
Performing arts education in the United States
Buildings and structures in Seattle
Culture of Seattle
Tourist attractions in Seattle
Theatre in Washington (state)